The gray birch mouse (Sicista pseudonapaea) is a species of rodent in the family Sminthidae. It is endemic to Kazakhstan, but possibly ranges into China. Its natural habitat is temperate forests.

References

Mammals of Central Asia
Sicista
Endemic fauna of Kazakhstan
Taxonomy articles created by Polbot
Mammals described in 1949